Joe Dakota may refer to:
 Joe Dakota (1972 film), a Spaghetti Western film directed by Emilio Miraglia
 Joe Dakota (1957 film), an American Western film directed by Richard Bartlett